Taliana María Vargas Carrillo (born December 20, 1987) is a Colombian actress, model, and television personality who was crowned Miss Colombia 2007  and placed 1st Runner-Up at Miss Universe 2008. Vargas is a student of Journalism at the Northern Virginia Community College in Alexandria, Virginia.

Born and raised in Santa Marta, Vargas is of Greek and Lebanese descent through her grandparents, and has Italian relatives.  She speaks fluent Spanish, English, and Italian, as well as some Greek and Arabic.

Pageantry

Miss Colombia 2007
Vargas was crowned as Miss Colombia on November 12, 2007,  thus bringing the first crown to her home department of Magdalena, Colombia. During the three-week-long competition, she was also awarded with the Miss Elegance, Best Face Award and The Queen of the Police.

Miss Universe 2008
During the pageant, Vargas was a top 10 finalist in the Best National Costume competition and in the Best In Bikini event (which had no bearings on the selection of the top 15 semi-finalists), Vargas was awarded 2nd place while Miss Mexico, Elisa Nájera, took first place. On July 14, 2008 during the pageant's finals, Vargas was announced as one of the 15 semi-finalists. In the swimsuit competition, she received the highest score with 9.433, thus entering the top 10 in first place. During the evening gown portion, she received one of the highest televised scores in recent years: 9.829. Vargas thus became one of the 5 final contestants, coming in first place. Despite being the clear winner in two out of the three rounds, after the interview portion, it was Dayana Mendoza of Venezuela who went on to win title of Miss Universe 2008 while Vargas ended up as 1st Runner-Up. Colombia has  reached  the 1st Runner-Up in Miss Universe during three consecutive years: Paola Turbay in 1992, Paula Andrea Betancourt in 1993, and Carolina Gomez in 1994. Her placement as 1st Runner-Up was the highest one of Colombia until Paulina Vega's win in 2014.

Acting career
Taliana appeared in her first leading role as Niña Cabrales in the RCN TV soap opera Chepe Fortuna in 2010. The show, a huge success in Colombia and other parts of South America, won Taliana a TVyNovelas Award for Favourite Actress in a Leading Role.

Taliana Vargas is the main character in a Colombian soap opera Rafael Orozco El Idolo. The soap opera is about a Vallenato singer from Valledupar, Colombia and Taliana plays the wife of the singer.

In 2017, she played Paola Salcedo, the wife of the Cali Cartel's security chief in the third season  of the American series made by Netflix; Narcos.

She has been the image of various brands in Colombia such as L'Oréal Paris Elvive, Studio F, Nestlé.

Personal life

Taliana Vargas is married to Alejandro Éder, a senior policy advisor to the Colombian government; they wed in 2015. They have two children, Alicia María Éder Vargas (born 2019) and Antonio Éder Vargas (born 2020).

References

External links
Taliana Vargas' Twitter

1987 births
Living people
Miss Colombia winners
Miss Universe 2008 contestants
Colombian beauty pageant winners
Colombian people of Lebanese descent
Colombian people of Greek descent
Colombian female models